Popstar: Never Stop Never Stopping is a 2016 American mockumentary musical comedy film directed by Akiva Schaffer and Jorma Taccone and written by and starring Andy Samberg, Taccone, and Schaffer. The trio also co-produced the film with Judd Apatow and Rodney Rothman. Sarah Silverman, Tim Meadows, Imogen Poots, Joan Cusack, and Maya Rudolph appear in supporting roles.

The film was released on June 3, 2016, by Universal Pictures, and it became a box-office bomb, grossing just over $9 million and failing to meet its budget of $20 million. Despite this, it received positive reviews from critics and has developed a cult following.

Plot 
Conner Friel is a musical prodigy at an early age, and he forms a pop rap group dubbed "The Style Boyz" with his childhood friends Lawrence Dunn and Owen Bouchard. They almost instantly gain fame in the music industry and inspire many of today's musicians. However, after failing to receive credit for writing Conner's guest verse on a popular single, Lawrence leaves.

After the Style Boyz disband, Conner becomes a solo act, taking on the name "Conner4Real", with Owen as his DJ. Lawrence begins farming in Colorado after a failed attempt at going solo. Conner's debut album Thriller, Also rockets to the top of the charts, and his fame increases. In 2015, Conner releases his sophomore album, Connquest, which is heavily panned due to his writing every song himself and using hundreds of different producers rather than Owen's original beats. With low sales, Conner's manager Harry suggests having Aquaspin, a home appliance manufacturer, sponsor the tour. The company's appliances begin playing Conner's songs when in use, causing a nationwide power outage.

Conner begins his tour, but the shows do not sell as well as he had hoped. Harry suggests they hire hip-hop artist Hunter the Hungry as an opening act, and the ticket sales begin to rise. Conner adds new gimmicks to his act, including a robotic mask for Owen, and publicizes his relationship with actress Ashley Wednesday. But when a trick is seemingly botched in Nashville, Conner is exposed naked (without his penis visible) mid-concert and becomes the subject of mockery. Conner's publicist, Paula Klein, suggests he pull another publicity stunt to deflect attention from his humiliation. Conner decides to propose to Ashley on live TV, with a display including several trained wolves and a performance by Seal. Seal's vocals agitate the wolves, and they break loose, mauling the attendees. The backlash against Conner grows, and Ashley breaks up with him and starts dating Seal, who sues Conner for his injuries.

Worried about the declining quality of his friend's music, Owen sets up a meeting between himself, Conner, and Lawrence. The reunion ends poorly when Conner refuses to acknowledge that Lawrence wrote the track that launched his career. As the solo tour progresses Hunter's career takes off, selling more records than Connor, and Hunter begins to extend his opening performances. At a concert, Hunter announces that he will perform as long as possible, causing Conner to rush to the stage. A brawl ensues when Hunter quietly admits that he orchestrated Conner's wardrobe malfunction. Conner demands that Harry let Hunter go and fires Harry after discovering he has signed Hunter. Connquest is later knocked off the charts, and Aquaspin decides to pull their sponsorship.

The remainder of the tour is canceled, and Owen decides to leave the team when Conner tests Owen and the entourage's loyalty by making them pancakes mixed with dog feces. After his beloved pet turtle Maximus dies, Conner sinks into a depression and moves back into his mother's house. He begins drinking heavily and starts selling crude horse drawings online. Paula forces Conner to leave the house and takes him to a club featuring Owen. Conner and Owen reconcile and decide to finally make amends with Lawrence. Conner gives Lawrence his Poppy, apologizes, and acknowledges his contributions. As the three get high and collaborate in Lawrence's studio, Conner receives news from Paula that a six-minute slot has opened for Conner to perform at the Poppy Music Awards due to Taylor Swift being arrested for murder. With encouragement from his friends, he decides to reunite the Style Boyz.

At the Poppys, Hunter and Mariah Carey argue on stage, and Harry quits as Hunter's manager after being insulted by him. Conner reconciles with Harry and later finds out that the six-minute slot has been shortened to three, forcing him to perform either a Conner4Real song or a Style Boyz song. Conner decides to perform the Style Boyz's new song "Incredible Thoughts" featuring Michael Bolton. Conner reflects on his lessons and the value of holding onto relationships after reaching stardom. He introduces a new baby turtle named Maximus II before a wolf from the disastrous proposal attacks him.

Cast 

 Andy Samberg as Conner "Kid Conner" Friel / Conner4Real
 Evan Fine as ten-year-old Conner
 Jorma Taccone as Owen "Kid Contact" Bouchard, Conner's former bandmate and current DJ
 Maxwell Jenkins as ten-year-old Owen
 Akiva Schaffer as Lawrence "Kid Brain" Dunn, Conner's former bandmate and songwriter who became a farmer following the breakup
 Elliott Smith as ten-year-old Lawrence
 Sarah Silverman as Paula Klein, Conner's publicist
 Tim Meadows as Harry Duggins, Conner's manager
 Maya Rudolph as Deborah, a representative for Aquaspin
 Joan Cusack as Tilly Friel, Conner's mother
 Imogen Poots as Ashley Wednesday, Conner's girlfriend
 Chris Redd as Hunter the Hungry, an underground rapper who tours with Conner
 Edgar Blackmon and James Buckley as Eddie and Sponge, members of Conner's entourage who serve as his yes men

Members of Conner's staff include: Ashley Moore as Sarah, his personal assistant; Bill Hader as Zippy, a roadie; Danny Strong as his perspective manipulator; Will Forte as his bagpipe player; and Justin Timberlake as Tyrus Quash, Conner's chef. Timberlake was uncredited for the role.

Will Arnett, Eric André, Mike Birbiglia, and Chelsea Peretti portray CMZ reporters, a parody of TMZ. Kevin Nealon appears as photographer Gary Sikes, and Paul Scheer plays the wolf handler at Conner and Ashley's engagement ceremony. Emma Stone makes an uncredited cameo as Claudia Cantrell, a well-known pop singer who helped kickstart Conner's solo career, and "Weird Al" Yankovic appears as the lead singer of Hammerleg. The wives of Samberg, Taccone, and Schaffer all make brief appearances: Joanna Newsom (Samberg's wife) as Zippy's flatline doctor; Marielle Heller (Taccone's wife) as a member of Conner's documentary crew; and Liz Cackowski (Schaffer's wife) as the Poppies stage manager. Judd Apatow voices one of Conner's fans.

Cameos as themselves

 Akon
 ASAP Rocky
 Big Boy
 Michael Bolton
 Win Butler
 Mariah Carey
 Régine Chassagne
 Simon Cowell
 Miley Cyrus
 Danger Mouse
 DJ Khaled
 Jimmy Fallon
 50 Cent
 Steve Higgins
 Adam Levine
 Nas
 Pink
 Questlove
 Behati Prinsloo
 Katy Perry
 Rihanna
 The Roots
 RZA
 Seal
 Martin Sheen
 Snoop Dogg
 Ringo Starr
 Asa Taccone
 T.I.
 Carrie Underwood
 Usher
 Pharrell Williams

Production 
Principal photography on the film began on May 14, 2015, announced by Universal Pictures under the working title Conner4real.

Release
The film was advertised on YouTube the month of its release date. On May 10, 2016, Samberg made an appearance on NBC's The Voice in character as Conner4real to perform "I'm So Humble", alongside judge Adam Levine, and give answers to contestants in a farcical Q&A session. Samberg then made a guest appearance on the season 41 finale of Saturday Night Live, on May 21, 2016. Promoted as a new SNL Digital Short, he appeared in character as Conner4real and debuted a song from the movie ("Finest Girl"). Taccone and Schaffer received guest writing credits for the episode.  The Lonely Island also released a video "I'm a Weirdo" to their YouTube channel, featuring conner4real rapping on the street.

The film was released in the United States on June 3, 2016, and in the United Kingdom on August 26, 2016, by Universal Pictures. It did not get an international release.

Soundtrack

The Popstar: Never Stop Never Stopping soundtrack album, performed by the Lonely Island, was released on June 3, 2016, the day of the film's release.

Track listing

Charts

Reception

Box office
In the United States, Popstar: Never Stop Never Stopping opened on June 3, 2016, alongside Me Before You and Teenage Mutant Ninja Turtles: Out of the Shadows and was expected to gross around $7 million from 2,311 theaters in its opening weekend. The film grossed $322,000 from its Thursday previews and $1.8 million on its first day. In its opening weekend, the film grossed $4.6 million and finishing 8th at the box office. The film was a box office bomb, grossing just $9.5 million against its $20 million budget.

Critical response
On review aggregator website Rotten Tomatoes, the film holds an approval rating of 79% based on 175 reviews, with an average rating of 6.70/10. The site's critical consensus reads: "Popstar: Never Stop Never Stopping updates the rock mockumentary for the 21st century mainstream – and hits many of its low-hanging targets with side-splitting impact." On Metacritic, the film has a weighted average score of 68 out of 100, based on 43 critics, indicating "generally favorable reviews". Audiences polled by CinemaScore gave the film an average grade of "B" on an A+ to F scale.

Vince Mancini of Uproxx gave the film a positive review, saying: "It's as stupid as it is relevant, and that layering of humor styles — insightful satire, no-holds-barred vulgarity, irresistible juvenilia, surreal pop art, timeless deadpan — are Popstar‘s hallmark. It's smart, dumb, silly, and gross in all the right ways. I loved it." David Palmer of The Reel Deal gave the film 8/10, calling it the best comedy of 2016 and praised the songs. Ignatiy Vishnevetsky of The A.V. Club wrote: "No music mockumentary has really managed to reproduce This Is Spinal Tap'''s comic mojo, but Popstar: Never Stop Never Stopping gets closer than most to that subgenre-defining comedy's mix of the dead-on and the over-the-top, even if it tends to go for quantity over quality."

Home mediaPopstar: Never Stop Never Stopping'' was released on Blu-ray and DVD on September 13, 2016. As of June 16, 2017, it had made $1.1 million in home media sales. Shout! Factory released the film on Blu-ray on November 12, 2019, which included the previous special features in a limited edition steelbook case.

Sequel
In 2022, Schaffer announced that a sequel to the film is not in the works, but is not off the table.

See also
Blizzard Man - Samberg's SNL sketch about a questionable rapper.

References

External links 
 
 
 
 
 

2016 films
2016 comedy films
American mockumentary films
Apatow Productions films
Films directed by Akiva Schaffer
Films directed by Jorma Taccone
Films produced by Judd Apatow
Films about music and musicians
Films set in 2015
Perfect World Pictures films
The Lonely Island films
Universal Pictures films
Publicity stunts in fiction
Films with screenplays by Akiva Schaffer
Films with screenplays by Jorma Taccone
Films with screenplays by Andy Samberg
2010s English-language films
2010s American films